A nutrition scale is a weighing instrument that outputs precise nutritional information for foods or liquids. Most scales calculate calories, carbohydrates, and fats, with more sophisticated scales calculating additional nutrients such as Vitamin K, potassium, magnesium, and sodium.

Scales often use USDA information on food to ensure accuracy. The products are used primarily as a weight-management tool but have found a user base with diabetics and hypertensive people.

Nutrition